Lost Verses Live is the second of two live albums released in spring 2009 by Mark Kozelek. Lost Verses Live was released on May 12, 2009. A limited edition vinyl pressing includes the exclusive live bonus tracks "I Am a Rock," "Last Tide," and "Floating," and was released in October 2009. The album was recorded live throughout solo tour dates in 2007 and 2008 in intimate, seated settings such as The First Unitarian Church in Philadelphia, Williamsburg Music Hall in Brooklyn, The Palace of Fine Arts in San Francisco and the Aladdin Theatre in Portland. Mark was accompanied by guitarist Phil Carney across the set.

Track listing

Credits
 Mark Kozelek – vocals and guitars
 Phil Carney – guitars
 Recorded live to CD-R at:
 The First Unitarian Church, Philadelphia – June 15, 2008
 Williamsburg Music Hall, Brooklyn – November 12, 2008
 Attuck's Theatre, Norfolk – November 7, 2008
 Aladdin Theatre, Portland – April 17, 2008
 The Palace of Fine Arts, San Francisco – April 26, 2008
 Stenhammarsalen, Gothenburg – October 24, 2007
 Santiago Alquimista, Lisbon – October 27, 2007
 Mastered by Aaron Prellwitz
 Photography by Nyree Watts
 Design by David Rager

References

Mark Kozelek albums
2009 live albums
Caldo Verde Records albums
Albums produced by Mark Kozelek